The 1952–53 Kangaroo tour was the eighth Kangaroo tour, in which the Australian national rugby league team travelled to Great Britain and France and played forty matches, including the Ashes series of three Test matches against Great Britain and three Test matches against the French. It followed the tour of 1948-49 and the next was staged in 1956-57.

The squad's leadership 
The team was captained by Clive Churchill with Frank Stanmore as vice-captain. Tour co-managers were Doug MacLean and Norm Robinson.
In the matches in which neither Churchill nor Stanmore played, the Kangaroos were captained by Duncan Hall on 4 occasions (Wigan, Swinton, Dewsbury, and Selection de Midi) and Albert Paul on 3 occasions (French Selection, French Selection, Paris-Lyon). Three players captained the team in one match: Keith Holman (Doncaster), Ferris Ashton (Wakefield Trinity) and Noel Hazzard (French Selection).

Touring squad 
The Rugby League News published a photo and details of the touring team including the players' ages, weights, heights, and occupations.
Match details - listing surnames of both teams and the point scorers - were included in E.E. Christensen's Official Rugby League Yearbook, as was a summary of the players' point-scoring. 
Crocker, Davies, Flannery, Hall, Hazzard, McCaffery, McGovern, and Rooney were selected from Queensland clubs. Carlson, Duncan, Gill, Paul, and Wells were selected from clubs in New South Wales Country areas. The balance of the squad had played for Sydney-based clubs during the 1952 season.

Match Results 
The touring party departed the eastern states before the conclusion of the Sydney, Brisbane and various regional competitions. On July 27, 1952, they played a match against Western Australia in Perth, winning 883. Australia played 27 matches in England before moving in mid-December to France for a further 13 matches.

1st Test

2nd Test

3rd Test

1st Test

2nd Test

3rd Test 

The ship arrived in Fremantle on March 6 and to Sydney on March 17. The players were welcomed home by local League authorities. 
A team selected from the touring Kangaroos played a match against The Rest of Australia on April 15, 1953. The Kangaroos won 33-21.

Sources

References

External links 
 1952-53 Kangaroo Tour at Rugby League Project

Australia national rugby league team tours
Rugby league tours of Great Britain
Rugby league tours of France
Kangaroo tour
Kangaroo tour